Maston Williams (April 23, 1879 – July 15, 1978) was an American actor who appeared in films during the 1930s. He appeared in more than 40 films between 1931 and 1939.

Selected filmography
 Clearing the Range (1931)
 Without Honor (1932)
 The Gambling Sex (1932)
 Fighting with Kit Carson (1933)
 The Lost Jungle (1934)
 The Outlaw Tamer (1935)
 Public Cowboy No. 1 (1937)
 Heart of the Rockies (1937)
 Whistling Bullets (1937)
 Call the Mesquiteers (1938)
 The Overland Express (1938)
 The Lone Ranger (1938)
 Heroes of the Hills (1938)

References

External links

1879 births
1978 deaths
American male film actors
Male actors from Texas
People from Navarro County, Texas
20th-century American male actors
Male Western (genre) film actors